Hypenidium graecum is a species of tephritid or fruit flies in the genus Acidogona of the family Tephritidae.

Distribution
Spain, Portugal, Morocco, Hungary, Bosnia, Greece, Ukraine, Israel.

References

Tephritinae
Insects described in 1862
Diptera of Europe
Diptera of Africa